Royal Prussian Jagdstaffel 56, commonly abbreviated to Jasta 56, was a "hunting group" (i.e., fighter squadron) of the Luftstreitkräfte, the air arm of the Imperial German Army during World War I. The squadron would score 63 aerial victories during the war. The unit's victories came at the expense of seven killed in action, four wounded in action, two injured in accidents, and one taken prisoner of war.

History

Jasta 56 began at Paderborn's Geschwader School on 20 October 1917, but was not officially established until 1 January 1918. Its first personnel reported in on 9 January 1918. It was assigned to 2 Armee on the 14th; it first saw combat on 9 February 1918. The new squadron scored first blood on the 19th. On 11 April 1918, it was consolidated into Jagdgruppe 6 and moved to support 4 Armee, remaining in that posting until war's end.

Commanding officers (Staffelführer)
 Franz Schleiff: 9 January 1918 – 27 March 1918
 Dieter Collin: 4 April 1918 – 13 August 1918
 Ludwig Beckmann: 13 August 1918 – war's end

Duty stations
 Neuvilly, France: 14 January 1918
 Mons-en-Chausee: 26 March 1918
 Ingelmunster, Belgium: 11 April 1918
 Rumbeke East, Belgium: 5 May 1918
 Croulshouten: 30 September 1918

Notable personnel
 Franz Schlieff
 Dieter Collin
 Ludwig Beckmann
 Franz Piechulek

Aircraft

Flying Albatros D.Va fighters from January 1918, the Jasta was re-fitted with Fokker D.VIIs during May 1918. The unit's marking for aircraft featured yellow nose and vertical stabilizer, white rudder, with a blue fuselage.

References

Bibliography
 

56
Military units and formations established in 1918
1918 establishments in Germany
Military units and formations disestablished in 1918